Michael Bernard Gottlieb (April 12, 1945 – May 23, 2014) was an American film director and screenwriter. He is best known for directing the films Mannequin (1987) and A Kid in King Arthur's Court (1995). 

Following the release of A Kid in King Arthur's Court,  Gottlieb transitioned into video game industry, working as a producer for the remainder of his entertainment career.

On May 23, 2014, Gottlieb was killed in a motorcycle accident on the Angeles Crest Highway in La Cañada Flintridge, California. He was 69 years old and is survived by his three daughters. At the time of Gottlieb's death he was a professor of film at the ArtCenter College of Design in Pasadena, California, teaching screenwriting in both the graduate and undergraduate departments.

Filmography
Mannequin (1987) – director, writer 
The Shrimp on the Barbie (1990) – director (under the pseudonym Alan Smithee)
Mannequin Two: On the Move (1991) – writer
Mr. Nanny (1993) – director, writer
A Kid in King Arthur's Court (1995) – director

References

External links

 Michael Gottlieb Video Game Credits at MobyGames

1945 births
2014 deaths
American male screenwriters
American video game producers
Art Center College of Design faculty
Film directors from New York (state)
Motorcycle road incident deaths
Road incident deaths in California
Screenwriters from New York (state)